The 2004 Absa Currie Cup First Division season was the second tier competition in the 66th Currie Cup season since it started in 1889.

Competition

There were six participating teams in the 2004 Currie Cup First Division. These teams played each other twice over the course of the season, once at home and once away.

Teams received four points for a win and two points for a draw. Bonus points were awarded to teams that scored 4 or more tries in a game, as well as to teams that lost a match by seven points or less. Teams were ranked by log points.

The top four teams qualified for the title play-offs. In the semi-finals, the team that finished first had home advantage against the team that finished fourth, while the team that finished second had home advantage against the team that finished third. The winners of these semi-finals played each other in the final, at the home venue of the higher-placed team.

Teams

Log

Fixtures and results

Regular season

Round one

Round two

Round three

Round four

Round Five

Round Six

Round Seven

Round Eight

Round Nine

Round Ten

Round Eleven

Round Twelve

Title Play-Off Games

Semi-finals

Final

Points scorers

The following table contain points which have been scored in competitive games in the 2004 Currie Cup First Division.

Cards

The following table contains all the cards handed out during the tournament:

Squad lists

See also
 2004 Currie Cup Premier Division
 2004 Vodacom Cup

References

External links
 

2004
2004 Currie Cup